St Edmund's Church, Forest Gate or the Church of St Edmund, King and Martyr, Forest Gate is an Anglo-Catholic church in the Forest Gate area of Newham, east London. It is dedicated to Edmund the Martyr. It originated in 1895 as the Red Post Lane mission district of All Saints parish. It became a parish of its own in 1901, with a permanent church completed in 1932. It now forms part of the East Ham Team Parish (also known as the Parish of the Holy Trinity) alongside St Mary Magdalene's Church, St Bartholomew's Church and St Alban's Church.

References

Church of England church buildings in Forest Gate
Church of England church buildings in East Ham
1895 establishments in England
19th-century Church of England church buildings
Anglo-Catholic church buildings in the London Borough of Newham